Again is the second studio album by Australian dance music duo, Pnau. The album was released in October 2003 on Warner Music Australia.

Track listing
Warner Music Australia version
"We Love the Fresh Kills" – 4:46
"Again" – 5:26
"Super Giants" – 4:32
"The Hunted" – 4:23
"Fear & Love" – 6:05
"Collision Course" – 2:19
"In the Valley" – 6:18
"Enuff's Enuff" – 4:45
"Bloodlust" – 3:26
"Crystal Science" – 2:46
"Foreigner" – 1:24
"Lovers" – 4:24
"Bubbles 'n' Mum" – 22:43

Underwater Records UK Reissue
"Foreigner" – 1:24
"We Love the Fresh Kills" – 4:46
"Donnie Donnie Darko" – 3:27
"Again" – 5:26
"Super Giants" – 4:32
"The Hunted" – 4:23
"In the Valley" – 6:18
"Fear & Love" – 6:05
"Enuff's Enuff" – 4:45
"Bloodlust" – 3:26
"Lovers" – 4:24
"Crystal Science" – 2:46
"Bubbles 'n' Mum" – 1:09
"The Last Track" – 9:28

Release history

References

2003 albums
Pnau albums